Timblo Drydocks Private Limited is a privately owned shipbuilding company based in Goa, India.

Capabilities
Timblo manufactures various type of inland vessels such as twin screw dry cargo barges, pontoons, dredgers, passenger launches, small floating jetties, etc. Timblo also constructs ocean-going crafts and multi-purpose vessels of up to 8000 DWT and  LOA. These also include, OSVs, PSVs, AHVs and various other specialised vessels.

Timblo also manufactures fiber-reinforced plastic boats such as patrol crafts, luxury boats. It is mainly a repair facility.

Ships constructed
Timblo class interceptor craft
Timblo class patrol craft

Peers
ABG Shipyard
Modest Infrastructure Ltd
Tebma Shipyard Limited
Shalimar Works (1980) Ltd

External links
Timbo dry docks
Timbo Shipyards

Shipbuilding companies of India
Shipyards of India